Darko Dejanovic is a businessman currently serving as the interim CEO of Solera Holdings.

Career
Dejanovic served as the Corporate Senior Vice President and Chief Technology Officer for the Tribune Company, where he worked from 1997 through 2007. In 2007, he made a move to Monster Worldwide where he took the role of Executive Vice President, Global CIO and Head of Product. Dejanovic accepted a position at the ACTIVE Network, LLC, in August 2011 as the Chief Technology, Product and Innovation Officer. In September 2012, Dejanovic was promoted to the President of the company, where he served through the acquisition of the company by Vista Equity Partners, upon the completion of which he was named CEO. In November 2019, Dejanovic was appointed as interim CEO to replace current CEO Jeff Tarr of Solera Holdings. While serving as interim CEO, Dejanovic will continue his role as operating principal and president of Vista Intelligence Group for Vista Equity Partners.

References

External links
Profile at ACTIVE Network, LLC

 

20th-century American businesspeople
21st-century American businesspeople
American computer businesspeople
American technology chief executives
Businesspeople in software
1970 births
Living people
People from Dallas
Businesspeople from Texas